Oregon Kaufusi (born 20 August 1999) is a Samoa international rugby league footballer who plays as a  for the Cronulla-Sutherland Sharks in the National Rugby League.

He previously played for the Parramatta Eels in the NRL.

Background
Kaufusi was born in Auckland, New Zealand. And is of Tongan and Samoan descent.

Early career
Kaufusi went to Hills Sports High School and developed as a Parramatta junior, playing Harold Matthews and SG ball for the Eels. He represented NSW 16's, 18's and 20's, also Australian schoolboys.

Playing career

2018
In 2018, Kaufusi started the season in Jersey Flegg, before being promoted to Intrust Super Premiership playing for the Wentworthville Magpies. He played 12 games and scoring 2 tries. On August 17, round 23 of the 2018 NRL season Kaufusi made his NRL debut for the Eels against the Melbourne Storm in a 20–4 loss. Kaufusi appeared in the Round 25 clash against the Sydney Roosters, playing 45 minutes making over 100 metres running. He completed 2018 with 2 NRL appearances.

2019
On 22 April 2019, Kaufusi scored his first try in the NRL during the first game played at the new Western Sydney Stadium as Parramatta defeated Wests Tigers 51–6. Kaufusi re-signed with Parramatta until the end of 2022.

Kaufusi made a total of eight appearances for Parramatta in the 2019 NRL season.  Kaufusi played for the club's feeder side the Wentworthville Magpies in their Canterbury Cup NSW grand final defeat against Newtown at Bankwest Stadium.

2020
Kaufusi played 13 games for Parramatta in the 2020 NRL season as the club finished third on the table.  He did not feature in Parramatta's finals campaign which once again ended in the second week of the finals.

2021
Kaufusi played 21 games for Parramatta in the 2021 NRL season.  Kaufusi did not play for Parramatta in either of their two finals matches against Newcastle or Penrith.
On 22 December, Kaufusi signed a two-year deal worth $400,000 a season with Cronulla starting in 2023.

2022 
Kaufusi played 28 games for Parramatta in the 2022 NRL season including the clubs Grand Final loss to Penrith.

In October Kaufusi was named in the Samoa squad for the 2021 Rugby League World Cup.

References

External links

Parramatta Eels profile
Wentworthville Magpies profile
Samoa profile

1999 births
Living people
New Zealand rugby league players
New Zealand sportspeople of Tongan descent
Parramatta Eels players
Cronulla-Sutherland Sharks players
Rugby league props
Rugby league players from Auckland
Wentworthville Magpies players